Zeitenspiegel Reportagen is an agency of writers and photographers based in Weinstadt, near Stuttgart, Germany. The agency works for all the major German magazines such as Stern, Focus, GEO, and Die Zeit, as well as international newspapers and magazines.

The agency’s signature style is reportage. 

In 2008, Zeitenspiegel members received awards, including the Ernst Schneider Award of the German Chamber of Industry and Commerce and a first-place finish in the European Parliament Prize for Journalism. In addition to classic photo reportages, the Zeitenspiegel group also takes on short assignments. Zeitenspiegel Reportagen is active in the field of advertising (Daimler, Pfizer) and corporate publishing through their subsidiary Agentur's.

Journalism Academy 
The Zeitenspiegel-Reportageschule Günter Dahl trains the next generation of feature journalists. The Zeitenspiegel members and renowned reporters and photographers share their skills and knowledge with young people in one-year courses. The Zeitenspiegel-Reportageschule Günter Dahl was voted the second-best Journalism Academy in Germany on journalismus.com.

Hansel Mieth Prize 
Since 1998, Zeitenspiegel has presented annual awards to members for reporting on socially relevant themes in memory of its honorary member Johanna “Hansel” Mieth. The Hansel Mieth Prize is presented to a reporter-photographer team for a completed feature in German, published or unpublished. Up-and-coming journalists have the opportunity to compete for the annual Gabriel Grüner Grant which funds research on an exceptionally promising story.
Zeitenspiegel dedicates this award to its member and friend Johanna Hansel Mieth of Santa Rosa, California (1909-1998).

External Links
Official website

References 

German journalism organisations
Stuttgart (region)